Paul David Graf (April 16, 1950 – April 7, 2001) was an American actor, best known for his role as Sgt. Eugene Tackleberry in the Police Academy series of films.

Early life and education 
Graf was born in Zanesville, Ohio, and later moved to Lancaster, Ohio, and graduated from Lancaster High School. He studied theatre at Otterbein College in Westerville, a suburb of Columbus, Ohio, where he graduated in 1972. He attended graduate school at Ohio State University until 1975, when he dropped out to pursue his acting career.

Acting career 
Graf made his first television appearance as a contestant on the game show The $20,000 Pyramid in December 1979, where he teamed with actress Patty Duke. He would later appear on subsequent versions of the show as a celebrity contestant, twice with Duke. As a struggling actor in the early 1980s, he also took small roles in popular TV shows, including M*A*S*H, The Dukes of Hazzard, Airwolf, Hardcastle and McCormick and The A-Team.

He made his film debut in 1981 when he played Gergley in the drama Four Friends. Graf later played the trigger-happy Eugene Tackleberry in the 1984 comedy Police Academy, and starred in each of the sequels. In 1986, Graf had a role as Councilman Harlan Nash on the short-lived sitcom He's the Mayor. In 1990, Graf appeared in the final two episodes of the series Beauty and the Beast. In 1992, Graf returned to play a minor role as a police officer again for the comedy series Seinfeld during its fourth-season episode "The Ticket" and also appeared on Night Court. He played Tackleberry for the final time in a guest appearance on the short-lived Police Academy: The Series. Also in November 1992, Graf appeared on Family Matters where he played Sgt. Shiska.

Graf made various guest appearances following his role in the Police Academy series, including a repeating part in The West Wing, several appearances in Star Trek: Voyager episode ("The 37s") and Star Trek: Deep Space Nine. In the latter series, he played a Klingon called Leskit in the fifth-season episode "Soldiers of the Empire".

Graf was Lt. Weismann in the movie Suture in 1993 and Ralph Brinker in the Disney Channel movie Brink! in 1998.

Graf made a guest appearance in an episode of the short-lived ABC sitcom Teen Angel as a camp leader for Steve Beauchamp's little sister Katie, in the 1997-1998 season. In 2000, he made an appearance on The Amanda Show as a paramedic who accidentally swapped pagers with Amanda Bynes. He also made an appearance on Lois and Clark: The New Adventures of Superman season 2 episode 20 as a reporter for the Daily Planet.

Graf had a small role in 1995's The Brady Bunch Movie, portraying Alice's boyfriend Sam Franklin, the butcher. In 1996, Graf made a guest appearance in Promised Land, which was a spinoff of Touched by an Angel. He played the role of a grieving husband whose wife died while working for a company and he went there trying to find answers to her death.

Graf guest starred in several episodes of ABC's sitcom Step By Step in the 1990s. He also starred in the second episode of the third season of ABC's Home Improvement as angler Chuck Norwood. Some of his last acting performances were two guest appearances as The Pentagon staff member Colonel Chase in the series The West Wing ("The Drop-In" and "The Portland Trip") and as Jacques Douche in the Son of the Beach TV series episode "Grand Prix". Graf's last acting role was the Nickelodeon sitcom  The Amanda Show, just three months before his death.

Screen Actors Guild
Besides his acting, Graf was a respected representative of the Screen Actors Guild. As well as serving as a Hollywood union rep, he was on SAG's national board, TV-theatrical steering committee, and national disciplinary review committee. Graf sought fair treatment for his fellow actors and actresses, which included efforts for better working conditions for the acting community.

Personal life
Graf married Kathryn Graf in 1983. They had two sons.

Death
While attending his brother-in-law's wedding in Phoenix, Arizona with his wife and two sons, Graf died from a sudden heart attack on April 7, 2001, nine days before his 51st birthday. His funeral was attended by many cast members from the Police Academy films. Graf is buried at Forest Rose Cemetery in Lancaster, Ohio.

Filmography

References

External links

 
 MSN Entertainment: Biography of David Graf
 Yahoo! Movies: David Graf

 

1950 births
2001 deaths
20th-century American male actors
American male film actors
American male television actors
burials in Ohio
contestants on American game shows
male actors from Ohio
Ohio State University alumni
Otterbein University alumni
people from Lancaster, Ohio
people from Zanesville, Ohio